El-Mansoura is a coastal region outside Kelibia city center. It is located in Nabeul Governorate, Tunisia.

References

Populated places in Tunisia